Gekko cicakterbang, the Malaysia parachute gecko, is a species of gecko. It is found in Malaysia.

References 

Gekko
Reptiles described in 2019